The following elections occurred in the year 1818.

North America

United States
 1818 Illinois gubernatorial election
 United States House of Representatives elections in New York, 1818
 1818 and 1819 United States House of Representatives elections
 1818 and 1819 United States Senate elections

Europe

United Kingdom
 1818 United Kingdom general election

See also
 :Category:1818 elections

1818
Elections